Chettupuzha is a residential area situated in the City of Thrissur in Kerala state of India. Chettupuzha is Ward 44 of Thrissur Municipal Corporation.

See also
Thrissur District

References

Suburbs of Thrissur city